The Eastern Revolt (RDL) is an Angolan nationalist organization that fought in the war for independence from Portugal under the leadership of Daniel Chipenda. The RDL drew its support from the Ovimbundu ethnic group.

In May 1966, Chipenda, then a member of the Popular Movement for the Liberation of Angola (MPLA), established the Eastern Front, significantly expanding the MPLA's reach in Angola. When the EF collapsed, Chipenda and MPLA leader Agostinho Neto each blamed the other's factions. In 1972 the Soviet Union allied with Chipenda's faction, giving him aid. The Eastern Revolt also received aid from the governments of Zambia and South Africa. Chipenda left the MPLA in 1973, founding the Eastern Revolt with 1,500 former MPLA followers. He opposed the MPLA's mestizo-leadership and was wary of the Soviet Union, despite its support.

In 1973, the Soviet Union invited Neto to Moscow and told him Chipenda planned to assassinate him. Although Chipenda joined the National Liberation Front of Angola (FNLA) in September 1974 the Eastern Revolt's existence continued and RDL forces fought against the MPLA in February 1975.

References

Rebel groups in Angola
Angolan War of Independence
Cold War